Marian Nietupski (born 26 May 1931) is a Polish rower. He competed in the men's coxless four event at the 1956 Summer Olympics.

References

1931 births
Living people
Polish male rowers
Olympic rowers of Poland
Rowers at the 1956 Summer Olympics
People from Sokółka County
Sportspeople from Podlaskie Voivodeship